Sadio Doumbia (born 12 September 1990) is a French tennis player.

Doumbia has a career high ATP singles ranking of No. 250 achieved on 7 November 2016. He also has a career-high doubles ranking of No. 52 achieved on 13 February 2023. Doumbia has won 1 ATP Challenger singles title at the 2016 KPIT MSLTA Challenger and 14 ATP Challenger doubles titles, 13 partnering with compatriot Fabien Reboul.

Career
Doumbia and Reboul received a wildcard invitation into the main draw of their home tournament at the 2022 Rolex Paris Masters, making their debut at the Masters 1000 level.
The pair reached their first ATP final at the 2023 Córdoba Open.
Doumbia reached the top 50 after a semifinal showing at the 2023 Rio Open with Reboul on 27 February 2023.

ATP career finals

Doubles: 1 (1 runner-up)

ATP Challenger titles

Singles

Doubles

External links
 
 

1990 births
Living people
French male tennis players
Sportspeople from Toulouse
Black French sportspeople
21st-century French people